The rivière des Indiens (in English: Indians River) is a tributary of the north shore of lac aux Araignées in the municipality of Frontenac, in the Le Granit Regional County Municipality, in the administrative region of Estrie, in Quebec in Canada.

Toponymy 
The toponym “rivière des Indiens” was made official on December 5, 1968, at the Commission de toponymie du Québec.

See also 

 List of rivers of Quebec

References 

Rivers of Estrie
Le Granit Regional County Municipality